Dusty & Stones is a country music duo from Eswatini, Africa, consisting of cousins Gazi "Dusty" Simelane (born 22 March 1982) and Linda "Stones" Msibi (born 23 December 1983), both vocalists, guitarists and songwriters. The duo was founded in 2005.

Dusty is mostly on lead vocals while Stones is mostly on harmony vocals. The duo released their first and only studio album, Mooihoek Country Fever, in 2009, which won the Best Country Music Artists/Group award in their home country for three consecutive years (2010, 2011 and 2013).

Two Irish radio DJs discovered their music in 2015. Their songs "Ride with me" and "Mkhulu welfu" became moderately popular in Ireland as a result.

Dusty and Stones share guitar solo parts during their performances.

References

Family musical groups
Swazi musicians
Country music duos